Mark Trodden (born 1968) is a theoretical cosmologist and particle physicist. He is the Fay R. and Eugene L. Langberg Professor of Physics and Co-Director of the Center for Particle Cosmology at the University of Pennsylvania.

Education and career
Trodden received both his Bachelor (mathematics) degree and a Certificate of Advanced Study in Mathematics (Part III) from Cambridge University.  He subsequently spent a year doing research and supervising undergraduates at Cambridge University. In 1992, Trodden moved to the United States to enter the Ph.D. program at Brown University and obtained his Ph.D. degree in 1995. He worked as a Research Associate for two years at MIT and two years at Case Western Reserve University after getting his Ph.D.  From 2000 to 2009, Trodden was a faculty member at Syracuse University, holding the Alumni Professorship from 2005 to 2009.

Research
Mark Trodden's main research areas are the cosmological implications of Quantum Field Theories, General Relativity, and Superstring Theories.  Trodden, with Sean Carroll, introduced a new class of topological defects in ordinary field theories.  Trodden's work in theoretical studies and understanding of the early universe has been widely cited and relied upon by the scientific community.

Specifically, Trodden's research focuses on configurations consisting of topological solitons which end on others of equal or higher dimension. In such models, the higher-dimensional defect provides Dirichlet boundary conditions for the lower dimensional one.

Trodden, with his co-workers Anne-Christine Davis and Steven Davis, has also investigated the particle physics and cosmological properties of topological defects in supersymmetic theories.  Their first study, dealing with abelian theories demonstrated that all spontaneously broken abelian supersymmetric theories admit cosmic string solutions which are superconducting due to fermion zero modes. Further, by using supersymmetry transformations, they showed how to calculate the supercurrents in terms of the background string fields. They also managed to extend these results to non-abelian theories and investigated the effects of soft supersymmetry breaking.

Trodden describes himself as a "particle cosmologist."

Academic papers

See also
 List of theoretical physicists

References

External links
Mark Trodden's personal website
Mark Trodden's papers in the INSPIRE-HEP database
Videos (with mp3s available) of discussions on physics/cosmology with Trodden on Bloggingheads.tv

British cosmologists
Syracuse University faculty
21st-century British physicists
1968 births
Living people
Science bloggers
Theoretical physicists
Brown University alumni
Fellows of the American Physical Society